The Lockman Hole is an area of the sky in which minimal amounts of neutral hydrogen gas are observed.  Clouds of neutral hydrogen glow faintly with infrared light and obscure distant views at extreme ultraviolet and soft x-ray wavelengths.  They interfere with observations at those wavelengths in nearly all other directions since they are common in our galaxy.  So the Lockman Hole serves as a relatively clear window on distant objects, which makes it an attractive area of the sky for observational astronomy surveys. It is located near the pointer stars of the Big Dipper in the constellation Ursa Major and is about 15 square degrees in size. It is named after its discoverer, astronomer Jay Lockman.

Location
The Lockman Hole is located at about RA 10h 45m, Dec. +58° and is defined by a region of low neutral hydrogen gas and dust column density. Column density is a commonly used measure in astronomy for the quantity of a given chemical element or molecule in a certain direction. In this region, the typical column density of neutral hydrogen is NH = 0.6 x 1020 cm−2. This column density is moderately lower than typical values near the galactic poles, where NH  1020 cm−2, and H I column densities of NH > 1021 cm−2 are common at low galactic latitudes and towards H I clouds.

The region around B1950.0 RA  Dec  has a minimum NH of 4.5 x 1019 cm−2. There is a diffuse cloud covering half of the field.

The Lockman Hole East is a subregion of the Lockman Hole centered at J2000.0 RA  Dec .

The Lockman Hole North-west (LHNW) is a region that appears about as wide as the moon centered at J2000.0 RA  Dec ., with a column density of NH = 5.72 x 1019 cm−2.

Hydrogen gas absorption and emission
Clouds of neutral hydrogen are ubiquitous in the Milky Way galaxy, and effectively absorb photons that are energetic enough to ionize hydrogen, which requires an energy of 13.6 electron volts (in the extreme ultraviolet range). Even the relatively small amounts of hydrogen in the Lockman Hole absorb most radiation at and just above energies of 13.6 electron volts, but even so it transmits extreme ultraviolet and soft x-ray radiation from extragalactic objects to a greater degree than other areas of the sky.

Neutral hydrogen is also associated with diffuse emission at infrared wavelengths that can confuse observations of faint infrared sources.

Observations
The relatively clear field of view offered by the Lockman Hole has allowed its use to view extremely distant regions of the universe.  Observations by the Spectral and Photometric Imaging Receiver (SPIRE) instrument aboard the Herschel Space Telescope of the Lockman Hole have imaged thousands of extremely distant galaxies that appear as they did 10–12 billion years ago.

This field of view also contains hundreds of astronomical X-ray sources, some of them supermassive black holes.
The Chandra X-ray Observatory and ROSAT have been used to study X-ray sources from the Lockman Hole. Some 75 X-ray sources are observed with the PSPC of ROSAT.

Detailed X-ray spectral analysis has been performed on 123 X-ray sources in the Lockman Hole using XMM-Newton.

The diffuse X-ray background (XRB) has also been studied in the area.

Active galactic nuclei have also been studied in the area, for example MBC2005.

See also
 Chandra Deep Field South - a similar clear field-of-view
 Interstellar medium
 Local Bubble
 Local Interstellar Cloud

References

Further reading

External links
 Lockman Hole at Chandra
 Animations of Lockman Hole
 The Lockman Hole by the Herschel Space Observatory
 Spitzer Space Telescope and the Lockman Hole
 XMM-Newton Observations of the Lockman Hole
 The Lockman Hole from the Max-Planck-Institut für extraterrestrische Physik

Interstellar media
Observational astronomy
Ursa Major (constellation)
X-ray astronomy